ARA Patagonia was an armoured cruiser that served in the Argentine Navy between 1886 and 1927.

Design 
Patagonia was a steam-sail armoured cruiser with steel hull and wooden planking, and armoured conning tower. It was propelled by two compound horizontal engines, and two masts with brick sails.

It was equipped with two searchlights, two small steam boats, and five smaller boats with oars.

As designed, its main battery was one 250mm Armstrong gun at the bow, and one 150mm Armstrong gun at the stern and on each side; with Vavasseur mountings protected with armoured shields. The secondary battery had four 87.5 mm and two 65.2mm Armstrong guns. It also mounted eight Nordenfelt machine guns and six Gardner machine guns.

In 1899 the 250mm gun and two 150mm guns were removed, and the remainder artillery was redistributed.

History 

Patagonia was ordered in 1885 to the shipyard Stabilimento Tecnico Triestino in Trieste at a cost of £ 100,000; this transaction was widely criticized in Argentina as the Austro-Hungarian navy was purchasing ships in England rather than locally.

The ship was launched in 1886; its construction was completed that year. After finalizing trials, it departed Trieste on January 20, 1887, arriving in Buenos Aires on February 28 same year.

In January and February 1902 it participated in the naval exercises as part of the 3rd Division; it simulated a blockade of the River Plate in which it was successful.

By 1918 all weapons are removed and it is modified function as a transport ship under the same name, completing two trips between Buenos Aires and Ushuaia until being decommissioned in 1925.

See also 
 List of cruisers
 List of ships of the Argentine Navy

References

Notes

Bibliography

Further reading 

 
 
 
 .

External links 
 Cruiser “Patagonia” - Histarmar website (Historia y Arqueología Marítima - Crucero Patagonia) (accessed 2015-11-22)

Cruisers of the Argentine Navy
Transports of the Argentine Navy
1886 ships
Ships built in Trieste